Rose Hilton née Phipps, (15 August 1931 – 19 March 2019) was a British painter living in Cornwall. Her husband said that he would be only artist in their relationship, but she achieved recognition after he died.

Life
Hilton was born in Kent, in 1931 into a very religious family. There was not much art in her house but she cherished the religious illustrations that she saw. Her parents did not want her to be an artist but training in art to be a teacher was allowed.She attended the Royal College of Art in London but her parents insisted that she travel home each night to avoid the life in London. She and Bridget Riley were two of the leading students, both gaining first class degrees. She won the Life Drawing and Painting prize as well as the Abbey Minor Scholarship to Rome.

Upon her return to London, she began teaching art, and, in the late 1950s met her future husband, the leading abstract artist Roger Hilton. Roger actively discouraged his wife’s artistic endeavours, but following his death in 1975 she took up her brushes again. In 1977 she had her first solo show at Newlyn Art Gallery, and her post-impressionist, figurative paintings have achieved wide popularity.  Her work is often compared to that of the French Nabi painter, Pierre Bonnard and is noticeably influenced by that of Henri Matisse.

In 2008, a retrospective of Rose Hilton's work was held at Tate St Ives.

References

External links

  (managed by Messums)]
 "Colour fields" in Tate etc magazine Issue 12 / Spring 2008 with links to two related articles.
 "Rose Hilton: Look who's painting now - Rose Hilton's strict Christian parents weren't keen on her becoming an artist. But the person who actually stopped her painting was her husband – a prominent artist himself. Now nearly 80, she has finally answered her calling" Fiona Clampin in The Guardian, Saturday 19 March 2011
 Interview by Fiona Clampin broadcast on BBC Radio 4 5/04/2011 (Sound recording).
 "The beauty of ordinary things" a pack for teachers with information and practical ideas for groups, produced by the Tate Gallery St Ives, accompanying the 2008 retrospective, written by Angie MacDonald

1931 births
2019 deaths
20th-century English painters
20th-century English women artists
21st-century English painters
21st-century English women artists
Alumni of the Royal College of Art
Artists from Cornwall
Artists from Kent
English women painters